Joseph Jones was a member of the Province of North Carolina House of Burgesses, First North Carolina Provincial Congress, and North Carolina State Senate.

References

North Carolina state senators
18th-century American people
People from Pasquotank County, North Carolina
People of colonial North Carolina
Year of birth missing
Year of death missing
Members of the North Carolina House of Burgesses
Members of the North Carolina Provincial Congresses